Robert Bacon (1860–1919), U.S. Secretary of State and diplomat

Robert Bacon may also refer to:
Robert Bacon (writer) (died 1248), Dominican writer in England
Sir Robert Bacon, 3rd Baronet (1574–1655), English MP for St Ives
Robert L. Bacon (1884–1938), U.S. Representative for New York, banker and soldier
Tubby Bacon (Robert Bacon, 1930–2012), American baseball team owner
Bob Bacon (born 1935), American politician in Colorado
Robert Bacon (Iowa politician) (born 1955), American politician in Iowa
Robert Bacon (footballer) (born 1989), English association footballer

See also
Robert Bacon House (built 1830), historic house in Winchester, Massachusetts